East Tempe is an unincorporated community in west central Polk County, Texas. The community, on the periphery of Livingston, was named after the East Tempe Creek, a creek which goes through the area.

History
In 1860 settlers were farming lands around East Tempe. Around 1880 a sawmill opened. The Beaumont and Great Northern Railway opened in 1908; East Tempe, a flag stop, was connected to Livingston and Trinity via the railroad. The railroad closed in 1949. East Tempe had around 100 residents in 1990 and around 200 residents in 2000.

References

External links

Unincorporated communities in Texas
Unincorporated communities in Polk County, Texas